Stiphrometasia sancta is a moth in the family Crambidae. It is found in Syria, Iran, Turkey and Israel.

References

Cybalomiinae
Moths described in 1900